This is a list of plantations and/or plantation houses in the U.S. state of Louisiana that are National Historic Landmarks, listed on the National Register of Historic Places, listed on a heritage register; or are otherwise significant for their history, their association with significant events or people, or their architecture and design.

List of plantations

Historical background of the plantation era

Upland or green seeded cotton was not a commercially important crop until the invention of an improved cotton gin in 1793. With an inexpensive cotton gin a man could remove seed from as much cotton in one day as a woman could de-seed in two months working at a rate of about one pound per day. The newly mechanized cotton industry in England during the Industrial Revolution absorbed the tremendous supply of cheap cotton that became a major crop in the Southern United States.

At the time of the cotton gin’s invention, the sub tropical soils in the Eastern United States were becoming depleted, and the fertilizer deposits of guano deposits of South America and the Pacific Islands along with the nitrate deposits in the Chilean deserts were not yet being exploited, meaning that there were fertilizer shortages, leading to a decline in agriculture in the Southeast and a westward expansion to new land.

Transportation at the time was extremely limited. There were almost no improved roads in the U.S. or in the Louisiana Territory and the first railroads were not built until the 1830s. The only practical means for shipping agricultural products more than a few miles without exceeding their value was by water.  This made much of the land in the U.S. unsuitable for growing crops other than for local consumption.

Under ownership of Spain, the city of New Orleans held the strategically important location between the Mississippi River and Lake Pontchartrain. The Carondelet Canal, which was completed in 1794, connected the Tremé section of New Orleans with Bayou St. John, giving shipping access to Lake Pontchartrain as an alternative route to the Gulf of Mexico. The U.S. gained rights to use the New Orleans port in 1795.

Louisiana (New Spain) was transferred by Spain to France in 1800, but it remained under Spanish administration until a few months before the Louisiana Purchase.  The huge swath of territory purchased from Napoleon Bonaparte in 1803 was sparsely populated.  During the Thomas Jefferson Presidency, a high priority was to build roads to New Orleans, specifically the Natchez Trace and the Federal Road through Georgia, initially intended to facilitate mail delivery.

The Napoleonic Wars and the Embargo Act of 1807 restricted European trade, which did not recover until the end of the War of 1812 in 1815. The Year without a summer of 1816 resulted in famine in Europe and a wave of immigration to the U.S., with New Orleans being the destination of many refugees. The return of good harvests in Europe along, with the newly cleared and planted land in the Midwest and Mississippi River Valley and improvements in transportation, resulted in a collapse in agricultural prices that caused the 1818-19 depression.  Agricultural commodity prices remained depressed for many years, but their eventual recovery resulted in a new wave of land clearing, which in turn triggered another depression in the late 1830s.  Cotton prices were particularly depressed.

Until the development of the steamboat, transportation of goods on major rivers was generally accomplished either with barges or flatboats, floated downstream or pushed upstream with poles or by hand using overhanging tree limbs.  On the Mississippi River, most shipping was down river on log rafts or wooden boats that were dismantled and sold as lumber in the vicinity of New Orleans. Steam-powered river navigation began in 1811-12, between Pittsburgh, Pennsylvania, and New Orleans.  Inland steam navigation rapidly expanded in the following decades. Railroads appeared before the Civil War, though at first were used to link waterways. After the Civil War, railroads took over most of the hauling of goods.

It was during the period of expanding steam transportation that plantation agriculture dominated the Southern economy, with two-thirds of the millionaires in the U.S. living in Louisiana, mostly between Natchez, Mississippi, and New Orleans.  The surviving plantation homes range from relatively modest dwellings to opulent mansions, some containing original furnishings and many with period furniture.

Due to poor transportation and slow industrialization, plantations tended to be somewhat self-sufficient, growing most of their own food, harvesting their own timber and firewood, repairing farm implements, and constructing their own buildings.  Many slaves were skilled blacksmiths, masons, and carpenters who were often contracted out. Cloth, shoes, and clothing were imported from Europe and from the Northeast U.S.

The self-sufficiency of plantations and cheap slave labor hindered economic development of the South. Contemporary descriptions cite the lack of towns, commerce, and economic development.

Besides the necessity of river transportation, the ground near the rivers and old river channels contained the best agricultural land, where the sandy and silty soil settled, increasing the height of the natural levees.  The clay soil settled farther away from the rivers and being less stable, it slumped to muddy back-swamps. The plantations in the vicinity of St. Francisville, Louisiana, are on a high bluff on the east side of the Mississippi River with loess soil, which was not as fertile as the river alluvium, but was relatively well-suited to plantation agriculture.

Slave housing
Examples of slave housing can be found on many of the extant plantation complexes. Historically housing for enslaved people on Louisiana plantations (prior to the reconstruction era), featured cabins consisting of two rooms, with one family in each room. After the American Civil War in 1865, the United States of America had abolished slavery, and the architecture changed for laborers on plantations to include more space, one example of this is found at the Allendale Plantation in Port Allen.

Other notable examples of slave housing can be found at the Laura Plantation in Vacherie and at the San Francisco Plantation House in Garyville.

See also
History of slavery in Louisiana
History of Louisiana
List of plantations in the United States
Plantations in the American South
Plantation complexes in the Southeastern United States

References

Louisiana